Clarendon College is a public community college in Clarendon, Texas. It also operates branch campuses in Pampa and Childress. The college was established in 1898 by the Methodist Episcopal Church, South and administered as a private institution (offering baccalaureate degrees at one point) until 1927 when it became a publicly supported two-year institution.

As defined by the Texas Legislature, the official service area of Clarendon College is Armstrong, Briscoe, Childress, Collingsworth, Donley, Gray, Hall, and Wheeler Counties.

Notable alumni 

 Blues Boy Willie, African American blues music singer 
 Harold Dow Bugbee, Western artist
 Roy Furr, founder of Furr's chain of grocery stores and cafeterias 
 Radie Britain, musician
 Bill Sarpalius, a former Democratic member of the Texas State Senate and the United States House of Representatives
 Ryan Rohlinger, third baseman San Francisco Giants baseball player

References

External links 
 Official website

Universities and colleges accredited by the Southern Association of Colleges and Schools
Community colleges in Texas
Two-year colleges in the United States
Educational institutions established in 1898
Education in Armstrong County, Texas
Education in Briscoe County, Texas
Education in Childress County, Texas
Education in Collingsworth County, Texas
Education in Donley County, Texas
Education in Gray County, Texas
Education in Hall County, Texas
Education in Wheeler County, Texas
Buildings and structures in Donley County, Texas
Methodist Episcopal Church, South
NJCAA athletics
1898 establishments in Texas